The 1981 United Kingdom tornado outbreak is regarded as the largest recorded tornado outbreak in European history. In the span of 5 hours and 26 minutes during the late morning and early afternoon of 23 November 1981, 104 confirmed tornadoes touched down across Wales and central, northern and eastern England.

Although the majority of tornadoes were very weak, measuring FU-F1 on the Fujita scale, widespread property damage was reported, mainly from the small number of tornadoes which intensified to F2 strength. By the end of the outbreak, hundreds of properties across the country had been damaged.

Most of the tornadoes occurred in rural areas and small villages across central parts of the United Kingdom, although several large metropolitan areas were affected. The Liverpool area was the first to be struck by multiple tornadoes around 11:30, followed by the Manchester area around 12:00, the Hull area around 13:30 and the Birmingham area around 14:00. The strongest tornado of the outbreak, an F2 tornado, struck Holyhead in Anglesey, Wales at 10:30; the only other F2 tornado of the outbreak caused considerable damage in the village of Stoneleigh, Warwickshire around 14:00.

With 104 tornadoes, this single-day outbreak alone saw more confirmed tornadoes than any other whole year in British history – 1974 previously held the record, with 80 tornadoes across the whole year. At the time of the 1981 outbreak, there had only been one other tornado outbreak in recorded history which produced more than 100 tornadoes within 24 hours, that being the 1974 Super Outbreak in the United States. However, that outbreak included many more powerful tornadoes and resulted in hundreds of fatalities.

Meteorological background 
On 22 November 1981, a rapidly deepening low-pressure extratropical cyclone was centred just off the northern coast of Scotland. The central pressure of this system was 994 mbar at 12:00 GMT on 22 November, deepening to 968 mbar by 12:00 GMT on 23 November.

At the same time, a high-pressure anticyclone was pushing into southern England from mainland Europe. There was an unusually strong upper-level temperature gradient between the low- and high-pressure systems, with the low-pressure system funnelling in cold, arctic air from the north, clashing with humid, subtropical air moving up from southern Europe in the anticyclone.

During the morning of 23 November, a cold front attached to the southern edge of the low-pressure area began to cross the United Kingdom from west to east. Fuelled by this temperature gradient and warm subtropical air to the south, a number of supercell thunderstorms became embedded within the southern edge of the cold front and its pre-frontal rain bands, spawning the first tornadoes over Wales around 10:30 GMT. By mid-afternoon, 104 tornadoes had been confirmed across the United Kingdom.

Several days after the tornado outbreak, the high-pressure anticyclone to the south of the British Isles broke down, allowing colder arctic air to move in from the north, resulting in the start of a record-breaking cold wave.

Confirmed tornadoes

See also 
 List of European tornadoes and tornado outbreaks
 1091 London tornado
 1761 Great Malvern tornado
 2005 Birmingham tornado
 2006 London tornado

References 

Tornadoes in the United Kingdom
United Kingdom Tornado outbreak
Tornado outbreaks
United Kingdom Tornado outbreak
United Kingdom Tornado outbreak
Weather events in England
Tornado outbreak
Tornado outbreak